Hồng Ngự is a provincial city (thành phố) in Đồng Tháp Province in the Mekong Delta region of Vietnam. It was separated from Hồng Ngự District in 2008.

The town is subdivided into 5 wards: An Bình A, An Bình B, An Lạc, An Lộc and An Thạnh, and 2 communes: Tân Hội, Bình Thạnh.

Geography
Hồng Ngự city has its borders with Cambodia; bordered with Pray Veng province, Cambodia in the North, with Tam Nông district in the South, with Tân Hồng district in the East, and with Hồng Ngự district in the West.

Economic development
Hồng Ngự city is known as one key urban areas of Đồng Tháp province. Additionally, Hồng Ngự city is the key economic zone of the Đồng Tháp province in the North in agriculture and border economy.  This economic centre not only influences in Dong Thap province, but also contributes to the development of the economy of the whole area of Đồng Tháp Mười and the economic border corridor of the province.

References

Districts of Đồng Tháp province
Cities in Vietnam